The John Osterman Gas Station is a historic gas station on Route 66 in Peach Springs, Arizona.  It was listed on the National Register of Historic Places in 2012.

It was built in 1927 or 1929 or 1932, according to various sources.  According to Quinta Scott, it was built by Oscar Ostermann, John's brother, in 1932. The gas station is owned by the Hualapai Indians, who nominated it for the National Register in 2009.  Apparently the group has received a National Park Service grant to restore the station.

References 

Transportation buildings and structures on the National Register of Historic Places in Arizona
Buildings and structures completed in 1932
Buildings and structures in Mohave County, Arizona
Buildings and structures on U.S. Route 66
U.S. Route 66 in Arizona
Gas stations on the National Register of Historic Places in Arizona
National Register of Historic Places in Mohave County, Arizona
1932 establishments in Arizona